Vijayapuram Grama Panchayat (Vijayapuram Village Panchayat) is a village in Kottaym District  in Kerala, India. 

It is located close to Kottayam Municipality. The Panchayat headquarters is situated at Vadavathoor which is about 5 km east of Kottayam town.

References

External links
 Vijayapuram Panchayt Headquarters

Villages in Kottayam district